The Raid on Nakhla was the seventh Caravan Raid initiated by Muhammad, and the first successful raid against the Meccans, which took place at Nakhlah, in the Hejazi region of what is now Saudi Arabia. It took place in Rajab A.H. 2 (October AD 623). The commander was 'Abdullah ibn Jahsh al-Asadi, whom Muhammad dispatched to Nakhlah as the head of 12 Emigrants with six camels.

Background and participants
Before the first Badr encounter (Battle of Safwan), Muhammad sent his brother-in-law Abdullah ibn Jahsh, in Rajab with 12 men on a fact-finding operation. Abdullah took along with him Abu Hudhayfa, Abdullah ibn Jahsh, Ukasha ibn al-Mihsan, Utba b. Ghazwan, Sa'd ibn Abi Waqqas, Amir ibn Rabi'a, Waqid ibn Abdullah and Khalid ibn al-Bukayr. Muhammad gave Ibn Jahsh a letter, but not to be read until he had travelled for two days and then to do what he was instructed to do in the letter without putting pressure on his companions. Abdullah proceeded for two days, then he opened the letter; it told him to proceed until he reached Nakhla, between Mecca and Taif, lie in wait for the Quraysh and observe what they were doing.

Ibn Jahsh told his companions that whoever chose martyrdom was free to join him and whoever did not could go back. All the companions agreed to follow him (a few biographers write that two Muslims decided not to be martyrs and chose to return to Medina). Sa'd ibn Abi Waqqas and Utbah ibn Ghazwan lost a camel that they were taking turns to ride. The camel strayed and went to Buhran, so they went out looking for the runaway camel to Buhran and fell behind the group.

The attack
Participants were:
Amr ibn al-Hadrami, leader of the caravan
Uthman bin Abdullah ibn al-Mughirah from the tribe of Makhzum
Nawfal bin Abdullah ibn al-Mughirah, (Uthman bin Abdullah's brother)
Al-Hakam ibn Kaysan, the freed slave (Mawla) of Hisham ibn al-Mughirah

At Nakhlah, the caravan passed carrying loads of raisins (dried grapes), food stuff and other commodities. Notable polytheists were also there such as 'Amr bin Al-Hadrami, 'Uthman and Naufal, sons of 'Abdullah bin Al-Mugheerah and others. The Muslims held consultations among themselves with respect to fighting them taking into account Rajab which was a sacred month (during which, along with Dhul Hijja, Dhul Qa‘da and Muharram, war activities were suspended as was the custom in Arabia then).

One of Abdullah's men, Ukasha ibn al-Mihsan, was shaven in head to hide the real purpose of their journey and to give the Quraysh the impression of lesser Hajj (Umrah); for it was the month (Rajab) when hostilities were forbidden. When the Quraysh saw the shaven head of Ukkash, they thought that the group was on its way for pilgrimage and they felt relieved and began to set up camp. They said, "These people seek the `Umrah, so there is no need to fear them." The sacred months of the Arab pagans were the 1st, 7th, 11th and 12th months of the Islamic calendar according to the Muslim scholar Safiur Rahman Mubarakpuri.

Nevertheless, after much deliberation, the group did not want this rich caravan to escape. Abdullah bin Jahsh said: "Surely, if you allow the caravan to pass through tonight unmolested, they will reach the holy territory tomorrow and will thereby become forbidden to you. And yet if you kill them today, you will have killed them in the holy month when killing is forbidden". After hesitating and then convincing one another they decided to attack and take the booty/possessions.

While they (the Quraysh) were busy preparing food, the Muslims attacked. In the short battle that took place, Waqid ibn Abdullah killed Amr ibn Hadrami by shooting an arrow at the leader of the Qurayshi caravan. The Muslims captured two Quraysh tribe members. Nawfal ibn Abdullah managed to escape. The Muslims took Uthman ibn Abdullah and al-Hakam ibn Kaysan as captives. Abdullah ibn Jahsh returned to Medina with the booty and with the two captured Quraysh tribe members. The followers planned to give one-fifth of the booty to Muhammad.

Aftermath
The Quraysh also spread everywhere the news of the raid and the killing by the Muslims in the sacred month. Because of the timing, and because the attack was carried out without his sanction, Muhammad was furious about what had happened. He rebuked them (the Muslims) for fighting in the sacred month, saying: "I did not instruct you to fight in the sacred month."

Islamic primary sources
Muhammad initially disapproved of that act and suspended any action as regards the camels and the two captives on account of the prohibited months. The Arab pagans exploited this opportunity to accuse the Muslims of violating what is Divinely inviolable (fighting in the months considered sacred to the Arab pagans). This idle talk brought about a painful headache to Muhammad’s Companions, until at last they were relieved when Allah revealed a verse regarding fighting in the sacred months.

According to Ibn Qayyim al-Jawziyyah, Allah says that what the attackers did may be serious, but the sins of the Quraysh like disbelief, preventing people from "following way of Allah", expelling Muslims from Mecca, the Shirk which they practiced and the Fitnah resulting from your actions is a greater sin. Ibn Qayyim further states that "most of the scholars have explained the word Fitnah here as meaning Shirk; and the truth of it is the Shirk which its owner calls to, and he punishes those who are not put to trial by it (i.e. those who do not accept it)."

The Muslim Mufassir Ibn Kathir's commentary on this verse in his book Tafsir ibn Kathir is as follows:

According to Ibn Kathir, Muhammad refused to accept ransom until he was sure his companions were safe, he also threatened to kill the captives. He said: "For we fear for their safety with you. If you kill them, we will kill your people", Ibn Kathir cites Ibn Ishaq's 7th century biography of Muhammad as the primary source for this quote. The Muslim scholar Muhammad Husayn Haykal also mentions this and said the verse which permitted Muslims to fight in the months which were considered sacred by the Arab pagans had "brought the Muslims relief", and that then Muhammad had accepted his share of the booty.

Soon after his release, al-Hakam bin Kaysan, one of the two prisoners captured, became a Muslim. Mubarakpuri mentions that the Quran verse 47:20 was also sent down, dispraising the hypocrites and cowards who are scared of fighting, and exhorted Muslims to fight.

See also
List of expeditions of Muhammad
Military career of Muhammad
Muslim–Quraysh War

Notes

References

Campaigns ordered by Muhammad